Birol Aksancak (born April 8, 1979) is a retired Turkish footballer who played as a winger.

Career
Aksancak is a youth product of Ankaragücü, and had three separate stints in the club, and spent various seasons on loan with clubs in the TFF First League. He spent most of his career between the Süper Lig and the TFF First League. He was a part of Ankaragücü's greatest European success, scoring a goal for them in a 1–0 win against Atlético Madrid in the 1999–2000 UEFA Cup.

Personal life
On 10 August 2008 Aksancak was a passenger in a deadly car accident, where all four other passengers - his twin brothers and two friends - passed away. Aksancak was the only survivor of the accident.

References

External links

1979 births
Living people
People from Güdül
Turkish footballers
Turkey under-21 international footballers
Turkey youth international footballers
MKE Ankaragücü footballers
Ankaraspor footballers
Hacettepe S.K. footballers
İstanbulspor footballers
İstanbul Başakşehir F.K. players
Kardemir Karabükspor footballers
Karşıyaka S.K. footballers
Konyaspor footballers
Manisaspor footballers
Şanlıurfaspor footballers
Akçaabat Sebatspor footballers
Süper Lig players
TFF First League players
TFF Second League players
Association football wingers
21st-century Turkish people